9ice, born Alexander Abolore Adegbola Akande (born 17 January 1980), is a Nigerian musician, songwriter and dancer. He is known for his powerful use of the Yoruba language in his music as well as his proverbial lyrics and unique style of delivery.

Early life 
9ice was born into a polygamous home of five wives and nine children, in Ogbomosho, Oyo State in Western Nigeria. He grew up in the Shomolu Bariga suburbs of Lagos. He dreamed of being a musician. His parents discovered his singing talent, and decided to allow him become a musician.

Career 
In 1996, 9ice recorded his first demo, titled "Risi de Alagbaja", but it was not until 2000 that he released his first official solo song, "Little Money".

In 2008, 9ice released the single "Gongo Aso". With the song gaining popularity, 9ice was asked to perform at the Nelson Mandela 90th Birthday Tribute concert in London in June 2008. He went on to win the Best Hip Hop Artist of the Year at the MTV Africa Music Awards.

"Gongo Aso" won him four further awards at the 2009 edition of the Hip Hop World Awards held at the International Conference Centre, Abuja: Album of the Year, Artiste of the Year, Song of the Year and Best Rap in Pop Album.

In 2020, 9ice released another album, Tip of the Iceberg: Episode 1.

He is the founder and CEO of the record label Alapomeji Ancestral Record.

Discography

Certificate (2007)
Gongo Aso (2008)
Tradition (2009)
Certificate and Tradition reloaded (2010)
Versus/Bashorun Gaa (2011)
GRA/CNN (2014)
Id Cabasa (2016)
G.O.A.T (2018)/Classic 50 Songs (2019)
Fear of God (2020) Seku Seye (2020)
Tip of the Iceberg: Episode 1 (2020)
Tip of the Iceberg 2 (2022)

Awards

Nigeria Entertainment Awards Most Indigenous Act 2007
MOBO Best African Act 2008
MTV Africa Music Awards Best Hip Hop Artist 2008
Dynamix Awards Artist of the Year 2008
Hip Hop Awards Best Vocal Performance 2008
Hip Awards Revelation of the Year 2008
Hip Hop Awards Song of the Year 2009
Hip Hop Awards Best R&B/Pop 2009
Hip Hop Awards Album of the Year 2009
Hip Hop Awards Artist of the Year 2009

See also 
 List of Nigerian musicians

References

Yoruba musicians
Nigerian hip hop singers
Living people
21st-century Nigerian male singers
1980 births